The Southern Oral History Program (SOHP), located in the Love House and Hutchins Forum in the historic district of Chapel Hill, North Carolina, is a research institution dedicated to collecting and preserving oral histories from across the southern United States.

History
Founded in 1973 by Jacquelyn Dowd Hall and the History department of the University of North Carolina at Chapel Hill (UNC), the Southern Oral History Program is a part of UNC's Center for the Study of the American South. The SOHP is dedicated to the study of the American South as told by the many who lived, but did not write, history. The SOHP has collected over 4,000 oral history interviews with southerners who have made important contributions to various fields, been involved in specific historical movements, or lived through times of southern transformation. In the past 35 years, the Program has grown to become one of the more prominent collections of oral histories in the United States. Graduate students and faculty at UNC and the SOHP as well as independent researchers work to collect oral histories with the goal of "rendering historically visible those whose experience is not reflected in traditional written sources."

The SOHP is involved in many oral history outreach efforts, conducting workshops, aiding researchers interested in performing oral history interviews, and helping to promote the use of oral history in the classroom across North Carolina.

Access
All oral histories are stored in the archives at the Southern Historical Collection in the Wilson Round Library at the University of North Carolina at Chapel Hill, and are freely available to the public. Many interviews have not only audio but also full transcripts, abstracts, biographical forms on the interviewees, and field notes from the interviewers.  An interview database searchable by subject, project, interviewer, interviewee name, occupation, ethnicity, or interview number is available online. Traditionally, all oral histories have been accessible only on-site in the reading room of the Southern Historical Collection in Chapel Hill, N.C. However, a 2005 a grant-funded project, "Oral Histories of the American South" (OHAS), conducted by Documenting the American South began working to digitize 500 SOHP oral histories and provide online access to full audio, transcripts, and lesson plans for use of online oral histories in the classroom.

Research
Since 2001, much of the SOHP's research effort has been focused on the initiative "The Long Civil Rights Movement: The South Since the 1960s," which documents the history and evolution of the Civil Rights Movement and other parallel movements in the South, such as the women's movement. These interviews focus on three main areas: race and the public schools, economic justice, and gender and sexuality. In 2008, the SOHP received a $937,000 grant from the Andrew W. Mellon Foundation to continue to collaborate in their efforts to produce civil rights movement scholarship.

SOHP projects by series
Though the SOHP collects interviews from independent researchers across the South, most of the collection stems from field work conducted specifically by the SOHP. UNC faculty and students along with SOHP staff collect oral histories within the scope of specific interview series developed by the SOHP, listed below. Each series has a specific focus, and many contain sub-series.

A. Southern Politics
B. Individual Biographies
C. Notable North Carolinians
D. Rural Electrification
E. Labor
F. Fellowship of Southern Churchmen
G. Southern Women
H. Piedmont Industrialization
I. Business History
J. Legal Professions
K. Southern Communities
L. University of North Carolina
M. Black High School Principals
O. Foundation History: North Carolina Fund
Q. African American Life and Culture
R. Special Research Projects
S. Center for Creative Leadership
U. The Long Civil Rights Movement: The South Since the 1960s
V. The Hayti Spectrum: Documenting Negro Life of the 1920s, '30s, and '40s in Durham, N.C.

See the Southern Oral History Program Collection finding aid for descriptions of individual series and sub-series.

References

External links
 SOHP interview database 
 SOHP homepage 
 Oral Histories of the American South
 Finding Aid for the Southern Historical Collection's SOHP Collection, #4007 

University of North Carolina at Chapel Hill
Oral history